Lojze Krakar (21 February 1926 – 24 December 1995) was a Slovene poet, translator, editor, literary historian, and essayist. He also wrote poetry for children.

Krakar was born in Semič in White Carniola in 1926. He studied Slavic languages and literature at the University of Ljubljana and graduated in 1954 and obtained a doctorate from the Frankfurt Goethe University in 1970. He worked as a lecturer, editor, and translator.

In 1963 he won the Prešeren Foundation Award for his poetry collection Cvet pelina (The Flower of the Woodworm). In 1977 he was awarded the Grand Prešeren Award for his poetry collection Nekje tam čisto na robu (Somewhere There Right on the Edge)  He won the Levstik Award twice, in 1962 for his book of poetry for children Sonce v knjigi (The Sun in a Book), and in 1991 for his story in verse Prišel je lev (The Lion Arrived).

Published works

Poetry collections

References

Slovenian poets
Slovenian male poets
Slovenian editors
Slovenian translators
1926 births
1995 deaths
Prešeren Award laureates
Levstik Award laureates
University of Ljubljana alumni
Goethe University Frankfurt alumni
20th-century translators
20th-century poets
People from the Municipality of Semič